Nayyara Noor (3 November 1950 – 20 August 2022) was a Pakistani playback singer, considered one of Pakistan's most popular singers. She was known for performing in live ghazal singing concerts in Pakistani TV shows and in concert halls around the country.

Early life and career
Nayyara Noor was born on 3 November 1950 in Guwahati, Assam. Her family and ancestors belonged to a merchant class. Her father was an active member of the All-India Muslim League and had hosted Pakistan's founding father Muhammad Ali Jinnah during his trip to Assam before the partition in 1947. 

In 1957 or 1958, Noor, along with her mother and siblings, migrated from India to Pakistan, settling in Karachi. However, her father stayed back in Assam until 1993 to look after the family's immovable properties. 

As a child, Nayyara is said to have been inspired by the bhajans of Kanan Devi and Kamla as well as the ghazals and thumris of Begum Akhtar. Although Nayyara had no formal musical background nor formal training, she was discovered by Professor Asrar Ahmad at the Islamia College in Lahore when he heard her sing the Lata Mangeshkar bhajan “Jo tum todo piya” from Jhanak Jhanak Payal Baaje for her friends and teachers at an annual dinner at the National College of Arts in Lahore in 1968. Soon thereafter, she was asked to sing for the university's Radio Pakistan programs.

In 1971, Nayyara made her public singing debut in Pakistani television serials and then beginning with films such as Gharana (1973) and Tansen. She went on to sing ghazals, a form of song in Urdu poetry, penned by the famous poets such as Ghalib and Faiz Ahmed Faiz and performed with legends such as Mehdi Hassan and Ahmed Rushdi.

Awards and recognition
 Pride of Performance Award by the President of Pakistan in 2006.
 Nigar Award for best playback female singer in film Gharana (1973).
 Three Gold Medal Awards at the annual All Pakistan Music Conference concerts.

She performed at mehfils and mushairas, having cemented a following among ghazal lovers in Pakistan and India. Probably the most famous ghazal of hers was "Ae Jazba-e-Dil Gar Main Chahoon", written by Behzad Lucknavi (1900–1974), a renowned poet of Urdu naats and ghazals, scriptwriter and songwriter of Radio Pakistan. Nayyara Noor later won many awards for this ghazal.

Singing career 
She was a versatile singer; the following are some of the ghazals she recorded:

 "" (poet: Momin Khan Momin)
 "" (poet: Nasir Kazmi, Nayyara's favorite poet) 
 "" (poet: Nasir Kazmi)
 "" (Nazm; poet: Akhtar Sheerani; composer: Khalil Ahmed; a Pakistan Television production)
 "" (poet: Faiz Ahmed Faiz; a Pakistan Television production)
 "" (poet: Ahmed Shamim; for the PTV drama series Teesra Kinara)
 "Jalay tau jalao gori" (poet: Ibn-e-Insha)

The national song in Nayyara's voice, "Watan ki mitti gawah rehna", is widely listened to from Karachi to Khyber, Pakistan.

Selected songs 

More of her select songs are listed below:

Source(s): 

 "" (film: Baghi Haseena)
 "" (1975 film: Farz aur mamta; lyricist: Kaleem Usmani; music: M Ashraf)
 "" (1975 film: Dou saathi; lyricist: Tasleem Fazli; music: Robin Ghosh)
 "" (1974 film: Bhool; lyricist: Khawaja Pervez; music: Robin Ghosh)
 "" (1975 film: Ajnabi; lyricist: Tasleem Fazli; music: Nisar Bazmi)
 "" (film: Qismat)
 "" (film: Gumrah)
 "" (drama series Anjane Nagar)

In 2012, Nayyara Noor officially announced that she would no longer sing professionally. After her marriage, she maintained that her primary roles were those of a wife and a mother. She said that music was a passion with her but never her top priority.

Personal life 
She was married to Shehryar Zaidi. Her younger son Jaffer Zaidi is the lead vocalist of Kaavish music band, while the elder son Naad-e-Ali has started his career as a solo singer.

Death 
She died on 20 August 2022 in Karachi after a brief illness at the age of 71.

References

External links
 
 

1950 births
2022 deaths
20th-century Pakistani women singers
21st-century Pakistani women singers
Indian emigrants to Pakistan
Musicians from Guwahati
Nigar Award winners
Pakistani ghazal singers
Pakistani playback singers
Pakistani radio personalities
Pakistani women singers
Punjabi people
Radio personalities from Lahore
Recipients of the Pride of Performance
Singers from Assam
Singers from Guwahati
Women ghazal singers
Women musicians from Assam